Mitchell High School is the third-oldest high school in District 11 in Colorado Springs, Colorado, built in 1965 and named for aviation pioneer Billy Mitchell.

Mitchell High School is the only school in the district to feature a planetarium.

The school's colors are orange and navy blue, and the mascot is the Marauder.

The school's rival was Roy J. Wasson High School until the closure of that school.

Course offerings
Advanced Placement and Honors classes in all major content areas, CISCO and A+ certification programs
Air Force Jr. ROTC
Oceanology/Environmental Sciences
Pro Start Culinary Arts
Interior Design CAD
Auto CAD
Dance/Musical Theatre Programs
Project Lead The Way Biomedical Sciences

Notable alumni

 Cullen Bryant (class of 1969), former NFL player (Los Angeles Rams, Seattle Seahawks)
 R.W. Eaks (Class of 1971), professional golfer
 Gene Krug, former MLB player (Chicago Cubs)
 Burnie Legette, former NFL player
 Terry Miller, former NFL player (Buffalo Bills, Seattle Seahawks)
 Bob Sapp, former football player and retired professional wrestler, actor, and comedian; competed as a professional MMA fighter
 Steve Scifres, former NFL player
 Darryl Pollard, former NFL player, x2 super bowl champion with the San Francisco 49ers
 Robin Rand (class of 1974), four-star general in the U.S. Air Force
 David Nevue, Pianist, composer, creator of Whisperings: Solo Piano Radio

References

External links
 

High schools in Colorado Springs, Colorado
Educational institutions established in 1965
Public high schools in Colorado
1965 establishments in Colorado